Semini is an Italian surname. Notable people with the surname include:

 Antonio Semini (after 1547), Italian painter
 Ottavio Semini (1604), Italian painter

See also 
 Seminis (disambiguation)

Italian-language surnames